The Bittersweet Constrain is the fourth studio album by American dark cabaret artist Jill Tracy.

Track listing

2008 albums
Jill Tracy albums